Shillington may refer to:

Places 
 Shillington, Bedfordshire in the United Kingdom
 Shillington, Pennsylvania in the United States

People with the surname 
 Clare Shillington (born 1981), Irish women's cricketer
 David Shillington, Australian rugby league footballer
 David Shillington (politician), member of the Privy Council of Northern Ireland
 Geoffrey St. George Shillington Cather, an Irish recipient of the Victoria Cross
 Graham Shillington, chief officer of the Royal Ulster Constabulary (1970-1973)
 Ned Shillington, Canadian politician
 Robert Taylor Shillington, Canadian politician, mining owner and ice hockey executive
 Thomas Shillington (1835-1925), member of the Privy Council of Northern Ireland